The following is a list of clubs who have played in the Egyptian Premier League since its formation in 1948 to the current season. All statistics here refer to time in the Egyptian Premier League only, with the exception of 'Most Recent Finish' (which refers to all levels of play) and 'Last Promotion' (which refers to the club's last promotion from the second tier of Egyptian football). Egyptian Premier League teams playing in the 2018–19 season are indicated in bold, while founding members of the Egyptian Premier League are shown in italics. If the longest spell is the current spell, this is shown in bold, and if the highest finish is that of the most recent season, then this is also shown in bold.

As of the 2018–19 season, sixty-nine teams have played in the Egyptian Premier League. Five of the eleven founder members of the Egyptian Premier League are competing in the 2018–19 season. Two (Al Ahly and Zamalek) have contested every season of the Egyptian Premier League. Three (Ismaily, Al Ittihad, and Al Masry) were also founder members, though each team has been relegated at least once in the past.

As of the 2018–19 season, eight clubs, El Dakhleya, ENPPI, Misr Lel Makkasa, Nogoom, Petrojet, Smouha, Tala'ea El Gaish and Wadi Degla, are not founding members of the Egyptian Premier League, but have never been relegated since their debut in the Egyptian Premier League.

Table

El Mansoura have had the most separate spells in the Egyptian Premier League, with eight; two of their spells lasted a single season. The club were relegated for the first time during the 1957–58 season after losing the relegation play-offs, but managed to reach the top tier again after four seasons. This was one of the few seasons that the league had a relegation play-off competition instead of direct relegation. Their second spell in the Egyptian Premier League lasted only two years, finishing last in both seasons. They finished last in Group B of the 1962–63 season but won the relegation play-offs after they won against El Minya, who were last in Group A. In the 1963–64 season, they were automatically relegated and no relegation play-off competition was held. The club promoted again in 1974 and managed to stay at the top tier until the 1981–82 season; they finished second from bottom and relegated with four points away from the safe spot. Three years later, managed to promote to the Egyptian Premier League again but they were relegated during the 1986–87 season after finishing last again, but with only two points away from the safe spot. They gained promotion again in 1990 and stayed at the top tier for two years, until they got relegated after finishing last again in the 1991–92 season. They were promoted in the next season, but then suffered from an immediate relegation in the 1993–94 season, but managed to return to the Egyptian Premier League again after only season; which was the start of their best spell. They remained in the Egyptian Premier League for 10 consecutive seasons, with the 1996–97 season being their best by finishing third. They were relegated at the end of the 2004–05 season after finishing last. After spending four seasons in the Egyptian Second Division, they managed to gain promotion to the Egyptian Premier League; but suffered an immediate return to the Egyptian Second Division as they finished second from bottom on goal difference in the 2009–10 season.

Ittihad Suez and Suez were both members of the Egyptian Premier League during the fifties and sixties, but later merged with Montakhab Suez to form one club representing the governorate, which played in the Egyptian Premier League for fifteen seasons.

Location of all clubs who have competed in the Egyptian Premier League

References

Notes

Egyptian Premier League clubs